Millbrook Priory was a priory in Bedfordshire, England. It was established in 1097 and disestablished in 1143.

The little Priory of Beaulieu at Moddry, owned land at Millbrook, where originally a small cell had been founded by Nigel de Wast, as a cell of St. Albans, but when Beaulieu was founded, as a cell of St. Albans, the two cells, Beaulieu and Millbrook, were amalgamated.

See also 
 List of monastic houses in Bedfordshire

References

External links
wikimapia
Gentleman's magazine

Monasteries in Bedfordshire
1097 establishments in England
Christian monasteries established in the 11th century
1140s disestablishments in England